Dendrochirotida are an order of sea cucumbers. Members of this order have branched tentacles and are suspension feeders. Examples include Thyonella and Cucumaria.

Characteristics
Holothurians in this order are characterised by ten to thirty much branched tentacles which are sometimes digitate. They also have ring structures composed of ten calcareous plates circling the pharynx. They have both retractor and introvert muscles which means they can retract the tentacles into the mouth when not feeding. The body wall is either firm with large ossicles or of a soft consistency with few ossicles. In some genera the animals attach themselves to hard surfaces but in others they burrow into soft sediments. Prey is captured by the sticky tentacles and transferred to the mouth. The larvae are lecithotrophic, not feeding on plankton but surviving only on materials already present in the eggs until they settle and become juveniles.

Taxonomy
Order: Dendrochirotida
 family Cucumariidae Ludwig, 1894
 family Cucumellidae Thandar & Arumugam, 2011
 family Heterothyonidae Pawson, 1970
 family †Monilipsolidae Smith & Gallemí, 1991
 family Paracucumidae Pawson & Fell, 1965
 family Phyllophoridae Östergren, 1907
 family Placothuriidae Pawson & Fell, 1965
 family Psolidae Burmeister, 1837
 family Rhopalodinidae Théel, 1886
 family Sclerodactylidae Panning, 1949
 family Vaneyellidae Pawson & Fell, 1965
 family Ypsilothuriidae Heding, 1942

References

 
Echinoderm orders